The Rottnest Channel Swim is an annual open water swimming event from Cottesloe Beach through Gage Roads to Rottnest Island, off the coast of Western Australia, near Perth.

Format 

It is held in February each year and is open to solo swimmers and teams of two or four. A second event, "Champions of the Channel" for elite solo swimmers, was introduced in 2016. The "Lavan Legal Charity Challenge" is an exclusive challenge for 30 teams of four for those who wish to fundraise money for a charity of their choice while competing for the Lavan Legal Charity Challenge Cup.

History
When Rottnest Island was used as a prison it was rumoured that some of the prisoners swam back to the mainland, although there is no proof that any did. However, some may have crossed by resting on Carnac and Garden Islands. The first documented crossing by a swimmer was Gerd Von Dincklage-Schulenburg, 24 January 1956, in 9 hours and 45 minutes. As of October 2016, von Dinklage was aged 87 and living in the German town of Dörentrup.

First race - early years 
Von Dincklages' swim led the Weekend Mail newspaper to hold the first organised race to the island later that year, in March 1956, which was completed by four participants. In the years to come, the first woman to swim to the island was 23-year-old Lesley Cherriman on 13 April 1969. She swam from Natural Jetty to North Mole and became the first female to complete a crossing, a feat she repeated on 18 February 1970 and again on 4 April 1971 from the mainland to Rottnest.

In 1990, The Rottnest Channel Swim Association (RCSA) was formed with John Whitehead as its first president. Despite the modest success of the 1956 event, another organised race to the island would not be held until 23 February 1991, with sixteen solo swimmers and seven teams competing, a total of 44 swimmers. The solo event was won in 4:30:03 by Peter Galvin. The success of the swim led to it becoming an annual event. In 1994, the youngest swimmer to ever compete was Kutraleeswaran from Tamil Nadu, India, who completed the swim at the age of 13 in 1994.

By 1996, the race had 52 solos, 34 duos, and 135 teams for a total of 660 swimmers. David O'Brien was winner, with Brian Parker second, and Shelley Taylor-Smith third. The RCSA president was John Guilfoyle. In 1998 the Rottnest Channel Swim had 1,150 participants, and officially became the world's biggest open water swimming event.

Notable landmarks - 2000 to 2019 
In 2001, the history books were re-written when 2,022 people swam the Channel.  The Channel Swim had grown so large, an event management consultant was hired to assist volunteers in running the event.  Royal Life Saving WA began assisting the RCSA.  It was this year that Travis and Jarrad Nederpelt set the duo race record with a time of 3:55:54.

In 2004 swimmers began to be put into categories, with only 100 allowed to start at a time.  The team record was also lowered to 3:43:02. Due to the popularity of the race, and the number of support boats for the now 2,300 entrants, a ballot has been held since 2006 to limit the number of participants in the water at the same time.

In 2007, the race was cancelled due to poor weather conditions caused by cyclonic activity in the north west of Western Australia.  It remains the event's only cancellation in its history.

In 2013, swimsuit regulations were introduced which comply with FINA's open water swimming rules.  The RCSA was successful in increasing the number of boats in the water on event day which resulted in more swimmers participating.  All finishing swimmers completed the swim well before the final cut-off time and earlier than the 2012 event.

In 2014, the first Welcome to Country was conducted by Ingrid Comming at the pre-race briefing held at Challenge Stadium (now HBF Stadium) and Professor Len Collard performed a second ceremony at Cottesloe Beach on race day.

In 2015, the swim celebrated its 25th anniversary, with one of the highlights being the release of a commemorative book.  With the event outgrowing the finish line at the Hotel Jetty, the finish was relocated to the grassed area near the Fuel Jetty, which required a 20m ramp to be built over the dunes.

In 2016, the inaugural Champions of the Channel event was held, with Ben Freeman as the first male solo in 4:18:28 and Jaime Bowler as first female solo in 4:42:16.  The Premier of Western Australia, the Hon. Colin Barnett, celebrated his 20th year as the official starter of the race.  Tandem solos (two solos sharing one boat) were introduced.

2018 was an eventful year, with records broken, a boat sinking, a propeller strike, a 3:30pm finish and the event's first-ever shark sighting evacuation.  Favourable conditions led to records tumbling with Solomon Wright setting a new solo race record of 3:59:28. The prior record was set in 2000 by Mark Saliba at 4:00:15. The female solo race record of 4:21:55 was set by Heidi Gan and the male team record was broken by Reilly Kennedy, Callum Lauriston, Nicholas Rollo and William Rollo in 3:36:36.

2020 
Despite the global COVID-19 pandemic, the 30th channel swim was still held on 22 February 2020. The line honours winner was Dutchman Lars Bottelier, finishing in 4 hours, 18 minutes and 26 seconds. William Rollo finished in second place in 4:22:16 and Kyle Lee finished third in 4:25:30. The first female solo swimmer across the line was Zoe Whitfield, of NSW in a time of 4:48:09, just ahead of Josie Page in second place at 4:48:42. In 2018 and 2019 Page finished in third place.

2021 
On 20 February 2021, more than 2,500 swimmers – aged between 14 and 76 – dived into the surf at Cottesloe Beach for 31st channel swim.  Andrew Donaldson was the first to finish, less than a year after his return to Perth in the middle of the coronavirus pandemic.  Donaldson crossed the line in a time of 4:04:30, more than six minutes in front of second finisher William Rollo.  Chloe Truscott was the fastest woman to complete the 19.7 km swim in a time of 4:33:20.  She was seven minutes in front of her nearest female competitor, Josie Page.  Winners of the Duo category were Kaiden Richings and Thomas Davis, two 16-year olds from Bunbury, in a time of 4:19:38.  Swimclan Big Orse's took out the team category in 4:14:37.

References

Further reading
 Mair, Olivia.(1999) In the swim. Perth Weekly, 17-23 Feb. 1999, p. 12-13,

External links
Rottnest Channel Swim Association website
 

Swimming competitions in Australia
Rottnest Island
Open water swimming competitions
Gage Roads